Bjarki Már Gunnarsson (born 10 August 1988) is an Icelandic handball player for Stjarnan and the Icelandic national team.

References

1988 births
Living people
Bjarki Mar Gunnarsson
Bjarki Mar Gunnarsson
Expatriate handball players
Bjarki Mar Gunnarsson
Bjarki Mar Gunnarsson